Taghamin Rural District is a rural district (dehestan) in Korani District, Bijar County, Kurdistan Province, Iran. At the 2006 census, its population was 3,781, in 844 families. The rural district has 17 villages.

References 

Rural Districts of Kurdistan Province
Bijar County